Extracellular superoxide dismutase [Cu-Zn] is an enzyme that in humans is encoded by the SOD3 gene.

This gene encodes a member of the superoxide dismutase (SOD) protein family. SODs are antioxidant enzymes that catalyze the dismutation of two superoxide radicals into hydrogen peroxide and oxygen. The product of this gene is thought to protect the brain, lungs, and other tissues from oxidative stress. The protein is secreted into the extracellular space and forms a glycosylated homotetramer that is anchored to the extracellular matrix (ECM) and cell surfaces through an interaction with heparan sulfate proteoglycan and collagen. A fraction of the protein is cleaved near the C-terminus before secretion to generate circulating tetramers that do not interact with the ECM.

Among black garden ants (Lasius niger), the lifespan of queens is an order of magnitude greater than of workers despite no systematic nucleotide sequence difference between them.  The SOD3 gene was found to be the most differentially over-expressed gene in the brains of queen vs worker ants.  This finding raises the possibility that SOD3 antioxidant activity plays a key role in the striking longevity of social insect queens.

References

Further reading 

 
 
 
 
 
 
 
 
 
 
 
 
 
 
 
 
 
 
 

Oxidoreductases
Copper enzymes
Zinc enzymes